The Solapur–Hassan Express (previously 22133/22134 Solapur Yesvantpur Superfast Express) is an Express train belonging to Central Railway zone that runs between  and  in India. It is currently being operated with 11311/11312 train numbers on a daily basis.

Service

The 11311/Solapur–Hassan Express has an average speed of 52 km/hr and covers 830 km in 16h 5m. The 11312/Hassan–Solapur Express has an average speed of 50 km/hr and covers 830 km in 16h 30m.

Route and halts 

The important halts of the train are:

 
 
 
 
 
 
 
 
 
 
 Kunigal
 Yediyur
 BG Nagar
 Shravanabelagola

Coach composition

The train has standard ICF rakes with max speed of 110 kmph. The train consists of 23 coaches:

 1 First AC and AC II Tier
 2 AC II Tier
 3 AC III Tier
 11 Sleeper coaches
 4 General Unreserved
 2 Seating cum Luggage Rake

Traction

Both trains are hauled by a Pune Loco Shed-based WDM-3D or WDM-3A diesel locomotive from Solapur to Yesvantpur, Hubli-based WDP-4B diesel locomotive from Yesvantpur to Hassan and vice versa.

See also 

 Solapur railway station
 Yesvantpur Junction railway station
 Hassan Junction railway station

Notes 
  
This train service was inaugurated by Dr Mallikarjun Kharge who was Minister of Railway this train was especially for the people who want to travel from Gulbarga to Bangalore. There was  shortage of trains on this route and especially Gulbarga people which was a big issue for them

References

External links 

 11311/Solapur–Yesvantpur Superfast Express India Rail Info
 11312/YesvantpurSolapur Superfast Express India Rail Info

Transport in Solapur
Transport in Bangalore
Express trains in India
Rail transport in Maharashtra
Rail transport in Andhra Pradesh
Rail transport in Karnataka
Railway services introduced in 2012